Dora Jessie Saint MBE (17 April 1913 – 7 April 2012),
née Shafe, best known by the pen name Miss Read, was an English novelist and, by profession, a schoolmistress. Her pseudonym was derived from her mother's maiden name. She is best known for two series of novels set in the British countryside – the Fairacre novels and the Thrush Green novels.

Biography

Dora Jessie Shafe was born on 17 April 1913 in London, the younger of the daughters of Arthur Shafe, an insurance agent, and his wife Grace. For the sake of her mother's health, the family moved to the country when Dora was seven, and she began school in Chelsfield, near Orpington, Kent, and later joined her older sister at Bromley county school. When her father became a schoolmaster, Dora followed his example and undertook teacher training at Homerton College, Cambridge.

From 1933 to 1940 she taught in Middlesex, first at Hayes and then at Ealing.

In 1940 she married Douglas Saint. The couple had one daughter, Jill.

After World War II she worked occasionally as a teacher, and began writing about schools and country topics for several magazines, including Punch and the Times Educational Supplement and worked as a scriptwriter for the BBC schools service.

From 1955 to 1996 Saint wrote a series of novels centered on two fictional villages, Fairacre and Thrush Green. The first Fairacre novel appeared in 1955, the last in 1996. The first Thrush Green novel appeared in 1959. The principal character in the Fairacre books, Miss Read, is an unmarried schoolteacher in a small village school, an acerbic and yet compassionate observer of village life. Saint's novels are wry regional social comedies, laced with gentle humour and subtle social commentary. Saint was also a keen observer of nature and the changing seasons.

Many of the village novels were illustrated by J.S. (John Strickland) Goodall (1908-1996), a fine artist and picture-book author in his own right.

One of the writers who influenced her was Jane Austen; and her work also bears some similarities to the social comedies of manners written in the 1920s and 1930s, and to the work of Barbara Pym. Miss Read's work has in turn influenced a number of writers, including American writer Jan Karon.  The musician Enya has a track on her Watermark album named after Saint's book Miss Clare Remembers, and one on her Shepherd Moons album titled No Holly for Miss Quinn.

Saint also wrote two volumes of autobiography, A Fortunate Grandchild (1982) and Time Remembered (1986); the two were issued together in 1995 as Early Days.

Saint retired in 1996. In 1998 she was made a Member of the Order of the British Empire for her services to literature. She and her husband lived in a hamlet near Newbury in Berkshire.

Her husband died in 2004. She died on 7 April 2012.

Bibliography

The Fairacre novels:
Village School* – 1955
Village Diary* – 1957
Storm in the Village* – 1958
Miss Clare Remembers –  1962
Over the Gate – 1964
Village Christmas** – 1966
Fairacre Festival – 1968
Emily Davis – 1971
Tyler's Row – 1972
Christmas Mouse** – 1973
Farther Afield – 1974
No Holly for Miss Quinn** – 1976
Village Affairs – 1977
The White Robin – 1979
Village Centenary – 1980
Summer at Fairacre – 1984
Mrs. Pringle – 1989
Changes at Fairacre – 1991
Farewell to Fairacre – 1993
A Peaceful Retirement – 1996
The first three books (marked with *) have been published in a single volume, Chronicles of Fairacre. The three Christmas books marked with ** have been published together.

The Market Square (1966) and The Howards of Caxley (1967) are set in the historical past of Caxley, the nearby market town to Fairacre where Fairacre people go from time to time.  Fairacre and Beech Green, a nearby village, are mentioned. The events in these books end before the events of the first Fairacre book start.

Thrush Green books:
Thrush Green – 1959
Winter in Thrush Green – 1961
News from Thrush Green – 1970
Battles at Thrush Green – 1975
Return to Thrush Green – 1978
Gossip from Thrush Green – 1981
Affairs at Thrush Green – 1983
At Home in Thrush Green – 1985
School at Thrush Green – 1987
Friends at Thrush Green – 1990
Celebrations at Thrush Green – 1992
Year at Thrush Green – 1995
Christmas at Thrush Green – 2009 written with Jenny Dereham
The World of Thrush Green – 1988.  This book discusses the real place that inspired Thrush Green and has excerpts from all Thrush Green books published as of 1988.

Children's books:
Hobby Horse Cottage – 1958
The Little Red Bus – 1964
The New Bed – 1964
No Hat! – 1964
Plum Pie – 1964
Hob and the Horse Bat – 1965
Cluck, the Little Black Hen – 1965
The Little Peg Doll – 1965
Tiggy – 1971.  A non-fiction biography of one of the author's beloved cats.
Animal Boy – 1975
"The Little Red Bus and Other Rhyming Stories" 1991 Omnibus containing The Little Red Bus, Cluck the Little Black Hen, Plum Pie, The Little Peg Doll, No Hat!, and The New Bed

Autobiography:
A Fortunate Grandchild – 1982
Time Remembered – 1986

These two were also published in an omnibus edition titled Early Days.

Others she has written:

Fresh from the Country – 1960.  The story of a young country girl who has taken a first teaching job in the big city.
Tales from a Village School – 1994.  Short stories.
Miss Read's Country Cooking – 1969.  
Mrs Griffin Sends Her Love: and other writings - 2013.  A selection of journalism, published posthumously.

References

External links

Appearance on Desert Island Discs - 4 July 1977

1913 births
2012 deaths
Pseudonymous women writers
Members of the Order of the British Empire
People from West Berkshire District
Alumni of Homerton College, Cambridge
English women novelists
20th-century English novelists
20th-century English women writers
Schoolteachers from London
20th-century pseudonymous writers